Ilaignar Ani is a 1994 Indian Tamil-language action drama film directed by K. R. Selvaraj. The film stars Radha Ravi (who also produced), with newcomers R. Harish, Ranjeev, Harikumar, Kannan, Prem Raj, Vijayraj and Sivasanth playing supporting roles. It was released on 7 October 1994.

Plot

The film begins with the capture of the terrorist Kumar (Vasu Vikram) by ACP Rajarajan (Radha Ravi). Rajarajan investigates on Kumar's possible links, so he meets his roommates Raja (R. Harish), Balu (Ranjeev), Murali (Harikumar), Devaraj (Kannan), Shankar (Prem Raj), Peter (Vijayraj) and Siva (Sivasanth). Soon, the youngsters clash with the terrorist Kumar who used them wrongly and the local liquor-shop owner (Raviraj).

Cast

Radha Ravi as Rajarajan
R. Harish as Raja
Ranjeev as Balu
Harikumar as Murali
Supergood Kannan as Devaraj
Prem Raj as Shankar
Vijayraj as Peter
Sivasanth as Siva
Chandrasekhar as Tamizhmani
S. S. Chandran as Kaliappan
Vadivelu
Sonia as Janani
Padmashri as Devi
Vasu Vikram as Kumar
Raviraj
Ganthimathi as Kothamalli
Disco Shanti as Rukku
K. S. Jayalakshmi as Pudina
Anuja
Srilekha
Shanthi Ganesh
T.K.S. Chandran
Peeli Sivam
R. Veeramani
Navarasam G.K.S.
Joker Thulasi
Marthandan
Karthik in a guest appearance

Soundtrack

The music was composed by Deva, with lyrics written by Muthulingam and Piraisoodan.

Reception
Malini Mannath of The Indian Express gave the film a mixed review and said, "A tighter hold on his screenplay, avoiding of repetition of situations and stronger characterisations would have brought out the message better". Thulasi of Kalki praised the director for handling the theme against violence in an interesting manner.

References

External links 

 

1990s action drama films
1990s Tamil-language films
1994 films
Films about terrorism in India
Films scored by Deva (composer)
Indian action drama films